Dilip Sarkar (1958 – April 1, 2019) was an Indian politician from the state of Tripura. In 2013 assembly elections, he represented Badharghat constituency in West Tripura district in Tripura Legislative Assembly.

In 2016, he was one of the six MLAs from Indian National Congress who joined All India Trinamool Congress, due to unhappiness towards party because of allying Communist Party of India (Marxist) in 2016 West Bengal Legislative Assembly election.

In August 2017, he joined Bharatiya Janata Party after they cross voted against the party lines in 2017 Indian presidential election.

2018 Tripura election
In the 2018 election he stood from Badharghat again as BJP Candidate against CPI (M) candidate Jharna Das. Many CPI (M) leaders from Badharghat including former DYFI Bishalgarh Committee president and CPI (M) local committee member Bidhan Ch. Deb joined him. With their support he won the 2018 elections with a margin of 5,000 votes.

References

People from West Tripura district
1950s births
2019 deaths
Tripura politicians
Indian National Congress politicians
Trinamool Congress politicians
Bharatiya Janata Party politicians from Tripura
Tripura MLAs 2018–2023
Year of birth uncertain